USA-248, also known as GPS IIF-5, GPS SVN-64 and NAVSTAR 69, is an American navigation satellite which forms part of the Global Positioning System. It was the fifth of twelve Block IIF satellites to be launched.

Launch 
Built by Boeing and launched by United Launch Alliance, USA-248 was launched at 01:59 UTC on 21 February 2014, atop a Delta IV carrier rocket, flight number D365, flying in the Medium+(4,2) configuration. The launch took place from Space Launch Complex 37B at the Cape Canaveral Air Force Station, and placed USA-248 directly into medium Earth orbit.

Orbit 
It is used to broadcast the PRN 30 signal, and operates in slot 6 of plane A of the GPS constellation.
 It is currently in service following commissioning on May 30, 2014.

References 

Spacecraft launched in 2014
GPS satellites
USA satellites
Spacecraft launched by Delta IV rockets